Einar Billing (6 October 1871 – 17 December 1939) was a Swedish hymnwriter and theologian. He was Bishop of Västerås from 1920 to 1939.

Billing was born 6 October 1871 in Lund. He was the son of bishop Gottfrid Billing.

Billing studied at Uppsala University and received a Bachelor of Arts in 1891 and a Bachelor of Divinity in 1898 and completed his Doctor of Divinity 1911. He also received a docent of moral theology and dogmatics in 1900. He served as assistant professor of moral theology and dogmatics from 1901 and professor of moral theology and dogmatics from 1909 at Uppsala University. Billing was ordained as a priest in the Church of Sweden in 1900 and served as a regimental pastor in Uppsala from 1901 to 1908. He was then vicar of the parishes in Hagby and Ramsta near Uppsala 1908 and vicar of the parish Heliga Trefaldighet (Holy Trinity) of Uppsala in 1909. The same year, he became a member of the Christian education society Pro Fide et Christianismo. He was elected as bishop of the Diocese of Västerås in 1920, an office he held until his death on 17 December 1939 in Västerås.

References

Notes

Sources 

 

 Svensk uppslagsbok vol 3 column 1114 Förlagshuset Norden 1955

1871 births
1939 deaths
Bishops of Västerås
Swedish Lutheran hymnwriters
Swedish Lutheran theologians
20th-century Protestant theologians